Sitiveni Halapua (13 February 1949 – 29 January 2023) was a Tongan politician and Member of the Tongan Parliament. He was a deputy leader of the Democratic Party of the Friendly Islands.

Academic career
Halapua had a PhD in economics from the University of Kent in England. Between 1981 and 1988 he lectured in economics at the University of the South Pacific in Suva, Fiji. He later worked as Director of the Pacific Islands Development Programme at the East-West Center in Hawaii. While working at the East-West Center he developed a conflict-resolution system based on the Polynesian practice of Talanoa, which he has applied in the Cook Islands, Fiji, and Tonga.

In November 2005 he was appointed to the National Committee for Political Reform, which aimed at producing a plan for the democratic reform of Tonga. In October 2006 the Commission recommended a fully elected parliament. He subsequently blamed Prime Minister Feleti Sevele's "hijacking" of the report for the 2006 Nuku'alofa riots.

Political career
Halapua was elected to Parliament at the 2010 elections, as MP for Tongatapu 3. Following the elections, he was suggested as a candidate for Prime Minister.

In July 2014 Halapua was dumped as a Democratic Party candidate. He subsequently announced he would campaign as an independent in the 2014 election, but ultimately chose not to stand. He later contested the 2017 election. He was unsuccessful.

References

1969 births
2023 deaths
Members of the Legislative Assembly of Tonga
Alumni of the University of Kent
Democratic Party of the Friendly Islands politicians
Academic staff of the University of the South Pacific
People from Tongatapu
Tongan academics
Tongan economists